Nuttallanthus texanus, the Texas toadflax, is an annual to biennial plant in the family Plantaginaceae found across much of the western United States. It can often be seen in patches along roadsides. Its inflorescence is raceme.

References

Plantaginaceae